Agios Efstathios ("Saint Efstathios";  "village of Zeibeks", previously ) is a village in Cyprus, located on the Karpas Peninsula. It is under the de facto control of Northern Cyprus. As of 2011, Agios Efstathios had a population of 36. It has always been a Turkish Cypriot village.

References

Communities in Famagusta District
Populated places in İskele District